The 1998 British Speedway Championship was the 38th edition of the British Speedway Championship. The Final took place on 17 May at Brandon in Coventry, England. The Championship was won by Chris Louis, with Joe Screen in second place and Paul Hurry in third.

Final 
17 May 1998
 Brandon Stadium, Coventry

{| width=100%
|width=50% valign=top|

See also 
 British Speedway Championship

References 

British Speedway Championship
Great Britain